Line 10 of the Madrid Metro is a rapid transit line in Madrid that is actually the product of two formerly separate lines.

The line links the towns of Alcobendas and San Sebastián de los Reyes with Madrid.

History

Origins
In the 1990s, Madrid planned for these two lines to become one, but there was a problem in that Line 8 used wider train sets than Line S. As a remedy, Madrid decided rebuild the Suburbano section to fit the large-profile rolling stock, a project that took five years to complete. This project removed all island platforms, widened tunnels, and modernized stations. The former section between Casa de Campo and Aluche was transferred to Line 5, which now terminates at Casa de Campo.

Southern extension
On 11 April 2003, Line 10 was extended to  where it meets Line 12 (also known as Metro-Sur). The last two stations on this extension are in fact outside Madrid and in the town of Alcorcón.  is also unique to this line and it is one of the few stations to have an island platform instead of side platforms. This station was opened to serve the nearby Aircraft Museum and is named after it. On 26 April 2007, the line was extended north from Fuencarral to Hospital del Norte (Hospital Infanta Sofía as of August 2008).

The station after Fuencarral,  is a transfer station between the regular line ("line 10A") and the northern extension ("line 10B"), the segment from Tres Olivos to Hospital Infanta Sofía.

Future
Proposed plans for Line 10 include the building of a new station between Colonia Jardín and Aviación Española called . However this is unlikely because Metro Sur already reaches Mostoles from Puerta Del Sur, but via .

Rolling stock
Line 10A uses 6-car trains of class 7000, and line 10B uses 3 car trains of class 9000.

Some Line 10 units are sometimes used for Line 7 service.

Gallery

See also
 Madrid
 Transport in Madrid
 List of Madrid Metro stations
 List of metro systems

References

External links

  Madrid Metro (official website)
 Schematic map of the Metro network – from the official site 
 Madrid at UrbanRail.net
 ENGLISH User guide, ticket types, airport supplement and timings
 Network map (real-distance)
 Madrid Metro Map

10
Railway lines opened in 1961
1961 establishments in Spain